Scaeostrepta is a genus of moth in the family Lecithoceridae. It contains the species Scaeostrepta geranoptera, which is found in New Guinea.

References

Natural History Museum Lepidoptera genus database

Lecithoceridae
Monotypic moth genera